The Kreeger Museum is a modern and contemporary non-profit art museum located in Washington D.C. It is located in the former home of David Lloyd Kreeger and Carmen Kreeger and it contains the art collection they acquired from 1952 to 1988.

Architecture 
The building was designed in 1963 by Philip Johnson with Richard Foster, and sits on five and a half wooded acres in Northwest DC.

Collection 

The Kreeger collection comprises mainly works from the 1850s to the present. The Impressionists are represented by nine Claude Monet paintings, as well as works by Auguste Renoir, Alfred Sisley, and Camille Pissarro. From his early work to the end of his life, Pablo Picasso's career can be traced through his paintings at the Kreeger. Other 20th century European artists include Edvard Munch, Max Beckmann, Jean Dubuffet, Wassily Kandinsky Vincent van Gogh and Joan Miró.

American artists include, among others, Alexander Calder, Clyfford Still, Frank Stella, Helen Frankenthaler, Joan Mitchell, Anne Truitt and James Rosenquist. Washington artists represented include William Christenberry, Gene Davis, Thomas Downing, Sam Gilliam and Betsy Stewart.

The permanent collection also includes examples of art from west and central Africa and Asia integrated throughout the museum.

Sculpture Garden 
The Sculpture Garden, an extension of the Museum, expands the outdoor exhibition space and affords visitors additional opportunities to experience art in a natural setting.  The Sculpture Garden features work by Rainer Lagemann, George Rickey, Lucien Wercollier and notable Washington, DC- area artists Kendall Buster, Carol Brown Goldberg, Dalya Luttwak, and Foon Sham.

The Sculpture Terrace features works by Jean Arp, Aristide Maillol, Jacques Lipchitz, Henry Moore, Isamu Noguchi, and Francesco Somaini.

The Reflecting Pool Terrace features Inventions, a series of six large-scale sculptures by John L. Dreyfuss.

References

External links

 Official website

1994 establishments in Washington, D.C.
Art museums established in 1994
Art museums and galleries in Washington, D.C.
Former private collections in the United States
Houses completed in 1967
Philip Johnson buildings